Viktor Tokaji (born January 11, 1977 in Dunaújváros, Hungary) is a Hungarian former professional ice hockey defenceman who most notably played for Austrian Hockey League (EBEL) side, Alba Volán Székesfehérvár.

Playing career
Tokaji originally played for Dunaferr SE Dunaújváros from 1993 to 2006. In the 2006–07 season he transferred to Sweden, where he played for Huddinge IK. From 2007 to 2015, he had been one of the leaders of his team, Alba Volán Székesfehérvár.

Tokaji has played over 150 games for the Hungary national ice hockey team.

References

External links
 

1977 births
Living people
Fehérvár AV19 players
Dunaújvárosi Acélbikák players
Sportspeople from Dunaújváros
Huddinge IK players
Hungarian ice hockey defencemen
Hungarian expatriate sportspeople in Sweden
MAC Budapest players